The "Histoire de Paris" plaques (sometimes called Starck Oars because of their shape and their designer, Philippe Starck) are information plaques scattered throughout the City of Paris in front of various Parisian monuments.

In 1992, Jacques Chirac, then mayor of Paris, asked the JC Decaux company to install the plaques.

Starck designed 767 panels. They appear to be in the shape of an oar, but are actually meant to recall a ship's paddle, in honour of the Latin motto of the City of Paris, "Fluctuat nec mergitur" ("battered by the waves, but never capsized").

The town of Paris pays 1.2M euros each year to the company JC Decaux .

These panels should be replaced by interactive kiosks.

The plaques are fondly regarded by most Parisians, as they highlight the cultural and political history of Paris. The Neolithic Period is the earliest era referred to, but there are 21st Century references, particularly to painters and writers.

The only translations of the plaques into English is via the Paris by Plaque walking guide series, which translates the text and places it in historical context, explaining the references and providing photos.

Notes

External links 
  https://plus.google.com/photos/102271478298892340726/albums/5606580537302351153?banner=pwa&gpsrc=pwrd1# : site with photos of the plaques

 (English) https://web.archive.org/web/20130814072222/http://www.parisbyplaque.net/ : the only English translation of the plaques, with historical context.

  http://borneshistoiredeparis.blogspot.fr/2016/05/normal-0-21-false-false-false.html

History of Paris
Geography of Paris